The following is a list of Radio Disney Music Award winners and nominees for Best Crush Song .

Winners and nominees

2010s

References

Crush
Song awards